Wernya baenzigeri is a moth in the family Drepanidae. It was described by Yoshimoto in 1996. It is found in Thailand.

References

Moths described in 1996
Thyatirinae
Moths of Asia